The 2011 Columbia Lions football team represented Columbia University in the 2011 NCAA Division I FCS football season. The Lions were led by sixth year head coach Norries Wilson and played their home games at Robert K. Kraft Field at Lawrence A. Wien Stadium. They are a member of the Ivy League. They finished the season 1–9, 1–6 in Ivy League play to finish in a tie for seventh place. Head coach Norries Wilson was fired at the end of the season after a 17–43 record in six seasons. Columbia averaged 4,409 fans per game.

Schedule

References

Columbia
Columbia Lions football seasons
Columbia Lions football